Ahmed Fadhel (Arabic:أحمد فاضل) (born 7 April 1993) is a Qatari footballer. He currently plays for Al-Wakrah.

External links

References

Qatari footballers
1993 births
Living people
Al-Wakrah SC players
Qatar SC players
Qatar Stars League players
Qatari Second Division players
Place of birth missing (living people)
Aspire Academy (Qatar) players
Association football midfielders